Irvin Castille (May 17, 1926 – August 4, 2015) was a shortstop and third baseman who played from 1951 through 1953 in the Negro American League. Born in Lafayette, Louisiana, he batted and threw right handed.

Castille joined the Birmingham Black Barons in the dying years of the Negro leagues. He also was selected to the East–West All-Star Game in 1953. In between, he played with the Brandon Greys club of the independent Mandak League in its 1952 season.

On June 8, 2008, Major League Baseball staged a special draft of the surviving Negro league players, doing a tribute for the surviving Negro leaguers who were kept out of the Big Leagues because of their race. MLB clubs each selected a former NLB player, as Castille was drafted by the Oakland Athletics.

A week later, the San Diego Padres honored him during a homestand highlighted by a Salute to the Negro leagues, fireworks and U.S. Army Appreciation Day at Petco Park. Late in the month, he signed autographs and shared stories about his playing days in the Times of Greatness Mobile event held at the Museum of Contemporary Art, Chicago.

Castille was a long resident of Whittier, California, where he died in 2015 at the age of 83.

Sources

1926 births
2015 deaths
African-American baseball players
American expatriate baseball players in Canada
Baseball shortstops
Baseball third basemen
Birmingham Black Barons players
Brandon Greys players
People from Whittier, California
Sportspeople from Lafayette, Louisiana
20th-century African-American sportspeople
21st-century African-American people